Vojtěch Kučera (born 19 January 1975 in Třinec, in the Czech Republic) is a Czech poet and literary editor.  He studied geography at the Faculty of Science of the Masaryk University in Brno. He is a longtime editor-in-chief of the poetry magazine Weles.

Works

Poetry

 Nehybnost    on-line 2008 & 2009; MaPa, Brno 2010
 A hudba?     Host, Brno 2005
 Samomluvy    Vetus Via, Brno 2000

References

External links
Vniveč (poems from Samomluvy - in Czech)

Czech poets
Czech male poets
1975 births
Living people
Masaryk University alumni
Czech editors
Czech magazine editors
Literary editors
Writers from Třinec